Gerald Feinberg (27 May 1933 – 21 April 1992) was a Columbia University physicist, futurist and popular science author.  He spent a year as a Member of the Institute for Advanced Study, and two years at the Brookhaven Laboratories. Feinberg went to Bronx High School of Science with Steven Weinberg and Sheldon Glashow and obtained his bachelor's and graduate degrees from Columbia University. His father was Yiddish poet and journalist Leon Feinberg. Among his students were Scott Dodelson, physicist at Carnegie Mellon University.

Research

He coined the term tachyon for hypothetical faster-than-light particles and analysed their quantum field properties, predicted the existence of the muon neutrino and advocated cryonics as a public service.  He was a member of the Foresight Institute's advisory panel.

Parapsychology

Feinberg wrote a foreword to Edgar Mitchell's book Psychic Explorations (1974) in which he endorsed psychic phenomena. His concept of a tachyon, a theoretical particle that travels faster than the speed of light has been advocated by some parapsychologists who claim that it could explain precognition or psychokinesis. However, there is no scientific evidence tachyon particles exist and such paranormal claims have been described as pseudoscientific.

Publications
Books
Cosmological Constants (with co-editor Jeremy Bernstein, 1986). 
Solid Clues: Quantum Physics, Molecular Biology, and the Future of Science, Simon & Schuster, 1985. 
Life Beyond Earth: The Intelligent Earthling's Guide to Extraterrestrial Life (with Robert Shapiro), Morrow, 1980. 
What is the world made of? : Atoms, leptons, quarks, and other tantalizing particles, Anchor Press/Doubleday, 1977.  & 
Consequences of Growth: The Prospects for a Limitless Future, Seabury Press, New York, 1977.  Review
The Prometheus Project, Mankind's Search for Long-Range Goals, Anchor Books, 1969. 

Papers

References

External links
NY Times Obituary

1933 births
1992 deaths
20th-century American physicists
Parapsychologists
Columbia University faculty
Columbia College (New York) alumni
Columbia Graduate School of Arts and Sciences alumni